Events in the year 2006 in Burkina Faso.

Incumbents 

 President: Blaise Compaoré
 Prime Minister: Paramanga Ernest Yonli

Events

June 
June – Medications such as praziquantel and ivermectin are distributed across the country to aide in prevention of intestinal parasites and related diseases.

November 
November – WAEMU provides wells to Burkina Faso for access to clean water to prevent diseases from entering the water supply.

December 
December – The country cancels a regional economic summit following clashes between soldier and police at Ouagadougou.

Deaths

References 

2000s in Burkina Faso
Years of the 21st century in Burkina Faso
Burkina Faso
Burkina Faso